Nosphistica orientana is a moth in the family Lecithoceridae. It was described by Kyu-Tek Park in 2005. It is found in Guangdong, China.

References

Moths described in 2005
Nosphistica
Moths of Asia